Phyzelaphryne nimio is a species of frog in the family Eleutherodactylidae. It is endemic to Brazil where it is found in the Japurá River basin. It is a poorly known species, only discovered on one river bank.

References

Eleutherodactylidae
Amphibians described in 2018
Amphibians of Brazil
Endemic fauna of Brazil